Palaeopsylla is a genus of insects belonging to the family Hystrichopsyllidae.

The species of this genus are found in Eurasia.

Species:
 Palaeopsylla alpestris Argyropulo, 1946
 Palaeopsylla anserocepsoides Zhang Jintong, Wu Houyoung & Liu Chiying, 1984

References

Hystrichopsyllidae
Siphonaptera genera